Anthony R. Bucco (February 24, 1938 – September 16, 2019) was an American Republican Party politician who served in the New Jersey Senate from 1998, where he represented the 25th Legislative District until his death. Bucco served as Co-Majority Leader in the New Jersey Senate with Republican Robert Singer and Democrat Bernard Kenny when both Republicans and Democrats had 20 seats in the Senate he previously served in the New Jersey General Assembly from 1995 to 1998. His son Tony Bucco was a member of the New Jersey General Assembly and was named to succeed him in the State Senate.

Personal life 
Bucco was born on February 24, 1938, and lived in the town of Boonton for most of his life. He served in the U.S. Army Reserve from 1957 until 1965. Bucco later resided in Boonton Township, New Jersey. He married the former Helen Jayne in 1959 and had one son, Anthony Mark.

On February 8, 2019, Bucco was diagnosed with throat cancer and was admitted to the hospital. On September 16, 2019, Bucco died of a heart attack at age 81.

Morris County politics 
Bucco served in various local offices before entering the State Legislature. He served on the town of Boonton's Board of Aldermen from 1978 through 1983, served as the town's mayor from 1984 through 1989, and was elected to the Morris County Board of Chosen Freeholders from 1989 through 1992. Bucco also served on the steering committee of the Morris County Economic Development Commission.

New Jersey General Assembly 
In the 2009 legislative elections, Anthony was elected to the seat in the General Assembly previously held by his father.

Before entering the Senate, Bucco served in the General Assembly, the lower house of the New Jersey Legislature, from 1995 to 1998, where he served as Assistant Majority Whip from 1996 to 1998. Bucco was first selected by district Republican committee and sworn in January 1995, to fill the remainder of the unexpired term of Rodney P. Frelinghuysen, who resigned his Assembly seat following his election to Congress. During the unexpired term, he served alongside Arthur R. Albohn in the 25th district. In his first Republican primary, Bucco and running mate Michael Patrick Carroll defeated his successor in the Assembly Rick Merkt and then-Freeholder Chris Christie along with two other candidates. Bucco and Carroll were easily elected in the general election and served one full two-year term.

New Jersey Senate

Elections
In the 1997 Senate election, Bucco defeated one-term incumbent Democratic Senator Gordon MacInnes.

Democrat Rupande Mehta is challenging Bucco for the June 8, 2021 senate primary. Mehta also ran against Bucco in the 2020 general election.

Tenure

In the Senate Bucco has served as Assistant Majority Leader from 2000 to 2002, Majority Leader from 2002 to 2004, Leader Assistant Minority Leader from 2006 to 2008, Deputy Minority Leader from 2008 to 2010, Republican Budget Officer from 2010 to 2019; he served as Chair of the Republican Conference at the time of his death.

Committees 
Health, Human Services, and Senior Citizens
Labor
Intergovernmental Relations

Electoral history

New Jersey Senate

New Jersey Assembly

References

External links
Senator Anthony Bucco's Official Site
Senator Bucco's legislative web page, New Jersey Legislature
New Jersey Legislature financial disclosure forms
2016 2015 2014 2013 2012 2011 2010 2009 2008 2007 2006 2005 2004

1938 births
2019 deaths
American people of Italian descent
Mayors of places in New Jersey
Democratic Party members of the New Jersey General Assembly
County commissioners in New Jersey
Democratic Party New Jersey state senators
People from Boonton, New Jersey
People from Boonton Township, New Jersey
21st-century American politicians